The 2022–23 FIBA Europe Cup is the eighth season of the FIBA Europe Cup, the second-level European professional club basketball competition organised by FIBA. The regular season began on 12 October 2022.

Team allocation
18 teams eliminated in the Basketball Champions League qualification rounds could join directly the regular season, depending on their decision as declared in the FIBA Europe Cup option form. The following 5 teams chose the option of ending their continental adventure if they were eliminated from the Champions League qualifying rounds and therefore refuse to participate in the FIBA Europe Cup:

  Río Breogán
  Leicester Riders
  Šiauliai
  TFT Skopje
  FMP Meridian

Teams
 1st, 2nd, etc.: Place in the domestic competition
 CL QR1, QR2, QR3: Losers from the Champions League qualifying rounds

Schedule
The schedule of the competition will be as follows.

Qualifying rounds

Draw
The 22 teams will be divided into 6 pots. For the quarter-finals round of Qualifications, teams from Pot 5 will be drawn against teams from Pot 4 and teams from pot 6 will be drawn against two teams from Pot 3. Teams from Pot 1, 2 and the other two teams from pot 3 will be seeded, and will enter directly in the semi-final stage of Qualifications. The winners of the semi-final stage will face each other in the finals of Qualifications. The four winners of the finals will then qualify for the Regular season and join the ten directly qualified teams and the 18 Basketball Champions League eliminated teams in the main draw.

Qualification Group A
Venue: Mitrovica, Kosovo

Qualification Group B
Venue: Jonava, Lithuania

Qualification Group C
Venue: Samokov, Bulgaria

Qualification Group D
Venue: Cholet, France

Lucky losers
Following the qualification of Tofaş, Unicaja and Bakken Bears to the Champions League, three lucky losers will also qualify for the regular season. Their identity will be determined in accordance with section D from FIBA Basketball Rules as follows:
 Point difference of the combined results from the Semi-Finals and Finals will be used as the first criterion. 
 Points scored in the Semi-Finals and Finals will be used as the second criterion.
 If the identity of the two is not determined using the previous two criteria, a draw will be held to determine the final classification.

Regular season

Draw
The draw took place in Munich, Germany on July 14.

The thirty-two teams were divided into 4 seeds and drawn into eight groups of four. A maximum of two clubs from the same country can be in the same group. In each group, teams play against each other home-and-away in a round-robin format. The group winners and runners-up advance to the second round, while the third and fourth-placed teams are eliminated.

Notes

 Indicates teams that qualify for BCL Regular Season, and three runners-up of the FEC Qualifiers filled their spots.

Group A

Group B

Group C

Group D

Group E

Group F

Group G

Group H

Second round

Group I

Group J

Group K

Group L

Play-offs

The play-offs began on 6 March and will conclude on 19 and 26 April 2023 with the 2023 FIBA Europe Cup Finals.

Quarter-finals
The first legs were played on 6–8 March, and the second legs were played on 14–15 March 2023.

Semi-finals
The first legs will be played on 29 March, and the second legs will be played on 5 April 2023.

Finals

The first leg will be played on 19 April, and the second leg will be played on 26 April 2023.

Individual awards

MVP of the Month

See also
 2022–23 EuroLeague
 2022–23 EuroCup Basketball
 2022–23 Basketball Champions League

References

External links
 Official website

 
FIBA Europe Cup
 
Current basketball seasons